Fabianne Therese Gstottenmayr is a Sri-Lankan American actress and director known for starring in several successful independent films including Netflix's Teenage Cocktail (2016), John Dies at the End (2012), Anchor Bay's The Aggression Scale (2012), A Glimpse Inside the Mind of Charles Swan III (2013), and the AMC web series The Trivial Pursuits of Arthur Banks (2011).

Early life 
Therese was born in Kansas City, Missouri. Therese's family often moved when she was growing up, including to Austria, Sri Lanka, Abu Dhabi, and Palm Springs. She originally focused on becoming a track runner before getting involved in acting.

She is a great-great-granddaughter of Ceylonese newspaper editor and democratic activist Armand de Souza.

Filmography

References

External links 
 

American film actresses
American television actresses
Living people
Actresses from Kansas City, Missouri
American people of Austrian descent
Year of birth missing (living people)
American people of Sri Lankan descent
21st-century American women